The 32nd Los Angeles Film Critics Association Awards, given by the Los Angeles Film Critics Association (LAFCA), honored the best in film for 2006.

Winners

Best Picture:
Letters from Iwo Jima
Runner-up: The Queen
Best Director:
Paul Greengrass – United 93
Runner-up: Clint Eastwood – Flags of Our Fathers and Letters from Iwo Jima
Best Actor (TIE):
Sacha Baron Cohen – Borat: Cultural Learnings of America for Make Benefit Glorious Nation of Kazakhstan
Forest Whitaker – The Last King of Scotland
Best Actress:
Helen Mirren – The Queen
Runner-up: Penélope Cruz – Volver
Best Supporting Actor:
Michael Sheen – The Queen
Runner-up: Sergi López – Pan's Labyrinth (El laberinto del fauno)
Best Supporting Actress:
Luminița Gheorghiu – The Death of Mr. Lazarescu (Moartea domnului Lăzărescu)
Runner-up: Jennifer Hudson – Dreamgirls
Best Screenplay:
Peter Morgan – The Queen
Runner-up: Michael Arndt – Little Miss Sunshine
Best Cinematography:
Emmanuel Lubezki – Children of Men
Runner-up: Tom Stern – Flags of Our Fathers and Letters from Iwo Jima
Best Production Design:
Eugenio Caballero – Pan's Labyrinth (El laberinto del fauno)
Runner-up: Jim Clay, Veronica Falzon, and Geoffrey Kirkland – Children of Men
Best Music Score:
Alexandre Desplat – The Painted Veil and The Queen
Runner-up: Thomas Newman – The Good German and Little Children
Best Foreign-Language Film:
The Lives of Others (Das Leben der Anderen) • Germany
Runner-up: Volver • Spain
Best Documentary/Non-Fiction Film:
An Inconvenient Truth
Runner-up: Darwin's Nightmare
Best Animation:
Happy Feet
Runner-up: Cars
The Douglas Edwards Experimental/Independent Film/Video Award:
So Yong Kim – In Between Days
Kelly Reichardt – Old Joy
New Generation Award:
Michael Arndt (screenwriter), Jonathan Dayton and Valerie Faris (co-directors) – Little Miss Sunshine
Career Achievement Award:
Robert Mulligan
Special Citation:
Jean-Pierre Melville's 1969 film Army of Shadows upon the occasion of its long-overdue U.S. release.
Jonas Mekas for his contributions to American film culture as a filmmaker, critic and co-founder of Anthology Film Archives.

References

External links
 32nd Annual Los Angeles Film Critics Association Awards

2006
Los Angeles Film Critics Association Awards
Los Angeles Film Critics Association Awards
Los Angeles Film Critics Association Awards
Los Angeles Film Critics Association Awards